Baltimore Review is an American literary magazine founded in 1996.  It publishes short stories, poetry, creative nonfiction, interviews, and items of interest to those interested in creative writing. The Baltimore Review, a literary journal of poetry and fiction, was founded by Barbara Westwood Diehl as a publication of the Baltimore Writers Alliance. The journal grew to become a nationally distributed journal, and later became an independent nonprofit organization. Susan Muaddi Darraj then led the journal from 2003 to 2010, expanding contributions to include creative nonfiction and interviews. In 2011, Barbara Westwood Diehl resumed leadership of the journal and now serves as senior editor with Kathleen Hellen.  The Baltimore Review became a Web-based journal in 2011, and the first Web issue was launched in February 2012. Web-published work would be collected in print issues. Work that first appeared in the Baltimore Review has been shortlisted for the Pushcart Prize and been noted in Best American Short Stories and other anthologies.

Notable contributors

 Jacob Appel
 Deborah Mitchell Ashburn
 Ned Balbo
Laura van den Berg
 Andrei Codrescu
 Michael Glaser
 Tom Glenn
 Sharon Goldner
 Melissa S. Hardin
 Reginald Harris
 Rosemary Harty
 Jamie Holland
 Adriana Husta
 Michael Kimball
 Dorianne Laux
 Jen Michalski
 Karen T. Miller
 Deirdra McAfee
 Meg Mullins
 Jay O'Callahan
 Michael Salcman
 Thomas Stringer
 Bill Valentine
 Eric D. Goodman

Masthead 

 Barbara Westwood Diehl - Founding and Managing Editor
 Dean Bartoli Smith
 Elise Burke 
 Joanne Cavanaugh Simpson
 Rick Connor
 Cody Ernst 
 Benjamin Goldberg
 Ann Eichler Kolakowski
 Amanda Fiore
 Jonathan Green
 Julia Heney
 Jennifer Holden Ward
 Lisa Lance
 Holly Morse-Ellington
 Bobbi Nicotera
 Lalita Noronha
 Michael Salcman 
 Seth Sawyers
 Ashley Scurto
 Holly Sneeringer
 Lynn Stansbury
 Matt Diehl - Webmaster

See also
 List of literary magazines

References

External links
 Baltimore Review Homepage

Annual magazines published in the United States
Literary magazines published in the United States
Magazines established in 1996
Magazines published in Baltimore
Poetry magazines published in the United States